Radosław Majecki (born 16 November 1999) is a Polish professional footballer who plays as a goalkeeper for Belgian Pro League club Cercle Brugge, on loan from Monaco. He represents the Poland national team.

Club career

In January 2020, Majecki agreed a contract until June 2024 with Ligue 1 side Monaco, who loaned him back to Legia Warsaw until the end of the 2019–20 season. The transfer fee paid to Legia Warsaw was reported as €7 million.

On 20 July 2022, he moved on a loan until the end of the season to Belgian side Cercle Brugge.

International career
Majecki made his debut for the Poland national team on 9 October 2021 in a World Cup qualifier against San Marino.

Career statistics

International

Honours 
Legia Warsaw
 Ekstraklasa: 2019–20

Monaco
 Coupe de France runner-up: 2020–21

References

1999 births
Living people
People from Starachowice
Polish footballers
Association football goalkeepers
Legia Warsaw II players
Legia Warsaw players
Stal Mielec players
AS Monaco FC players
Cercle Brugge K.S.V. players
Ekstraklasa players
I liga players
III liga players
Ligue 1 players
Belgian Pro League players
Poland youth international footballers
Poland under-21 international footballers
Poland international footballers
Polish expatriate footballers
Expatriate footballers in Belgium
Expatriate footballers in Monaco
Polish expatriate sportspeople in Belgium
Polish expatriate sportspeople in Monaco